Negro Necro Nekros is the debut album by Dälek, released in 1998. It is notable for its extended instrumental codas, industrial timbres and use of a sitar.

CD track listing

Vinyl track listing 
 "Swollen Tongue Bums" – 3:41
 "Images Of .44 Casings" – 10:27
 "Three Rocks Blessed" – 7:45
 "Praise Be The Man" – 12:00

Personnel 
 Dälek - lead vocals, producer
 Oktopus - producer
 Joshua Booth (tracks 1 and 5), Timoteo (track 2): guitars
 Brian Doherty: piano(track 4)

Production 
 All songs produced by Oktopus; tracks 1, 3, 4 and 5 co-produced by MC Dalek; track 2 co-produced by Timoteo; tracks 1 and 4 co-produced by Joshua Booth.
 Recorded and mixed by Alap Momin; additional recording and mixing by Will Brooks.
 Mastering: Dan Marino

References

1998 debut albums
Dälek albums
Gern Blandsten Records albums